SoVo may refer to:

Someron Voima, association football club from Somero, Finland.
Southern Voice (newspaper), an LGBT newspaper published since 1988 in Atlanta, Georgia
Southern Voices, the annual literary magazine published by Mississippi School for Mathematics and Science